, sometimes called , was a disciple of Hōnen, founder of the Jōdo-shū Buddhist sect. Shōkū later succeeded Jōhen, another disciple of Hōnen, as the head of a former Shingon Buddhist temple, Eikandō, established a separate branch of Jōdo-shū called the Seizan branch (after its namesake), and completed the transition of Eikandō from a Shingon temple into a Jōdo shū one.

Biography 
According to the temple's biography, Shōkū was born into a noble family, but by 14 years of age took an interest in Buddhism. In one legend, his mother stood before a famous bridge to have his fortune told.  At that time, a monk passed by chanting the Lotus Sutra, which convinced her that he should be a priest.  It was then that Shōkū studied under Hōnen for 23 years.  Later in life, he became a disciple of Jōhen, who had recently converted from the Shingon faith to the Jōdo-shū faith, subsequently converting the Eikan-dō as well.  Later Shoku took over as head of this temple, and fully converted the temple into a Jōdo shū temple, and began the Seizan branch.

After Hōnen had died, Shōkū also studied Tendai and esoteric Shingon Buddhism extensively with a focus on Pure Land teachings and practices.  He wrote an extensive commentary on the Taima Mandala at the invitation of the head priest of Taima-dera temple.

The temple biography mentions that Shōkū was very intense in his study and practice, and would recite the nembutsu up to 60,000 times a day, in addition to other ascetic practices. This echoes the words of Hōnen where one should study Buddhist teachings, but then return to the humble self to be saved by Amida Buddha.

This approach to Pure Land Buddhism won favor among the established Tendai sects, and so Shōkū was one of the few of Hōnen's disciples who was not exiled or executed in the year 1227, during the Karoku Persecution.

References

External links 
 The Taima Mandala Image of the Pure Land from a medieval Japanese scroll, based on the descriptions found in the Contemplation Sutra. This site offers explanations in English of the various motifs of the scroll.

1177 births
1247 deaths
Jōdo-shū Buddhist priests
Jōdo-shū
Founders of Buddhist sects
Heian period Buddhist clergy
Kamakura period Buddhist clergy